Our Lady of Ardilliers Church is a Catholic church located in Miquelon-Langlade, in the archipelago of Saint Pierre and Miquelon, a dependent territory of France in the North Atlantic Ocean. Since the abolition of the Apostolic Vicariate of Iles Saint Pierre and Miquelon on 1 March 2018, it is attached to the diocese of La Rochelle and Saintes. 

The church can be found near the port in the village of Miquelon, on the island of the same name. It is constructed entirely from wood and rectangular in shape, with a gable roof and a steeple above the façade.

The building was constructed between 1862 and 1865 to replace the first church in the archipelago, which was in disrepair. Inaugurated in 1865, the church is named in honor of Father Ardilliers and his sister, a nun at Notre-Dame-des-Ardilliers in Saumur, who probably funded the construction of first church in Miquelon.

External links

 Website of the Catholic Church in Saint-Pierre and Miquelon (in French)

References

Roman Catholic churches in Saint Pierre and Miquelon
Buildings and structures in Saint Pierre and Miquelon
Roman Catholic churches completed in 1865
Miquelon-Langlade
19th-century Roman Catholic church buildings in France